Æthelstan was the first King of the English, reigning from 924 to 939.

Æthelstan, Athelstan, or Athelstane may also refer to:

People

Mononym 
 Æthelstan Ætheling, heir apparent to Æthelred the Unready
 Æthelstan (bishop of Elmham), 10th-century bishop 
 Æthelstan (bishop of Hereford), 11th-century bishop
 Æthelstan Half-King, 10th-century ealdorman
 Æthelstan Mannessune, 10th-century landowner in the Fens
 Æthelstan of Abingdon, 11th-century abbot
 Æthelstan of East Anglia, 9th-century King of East Anglia
 Æthelstan of Kent, 9th-century sub-king of Kent,  son of King Æthelwulf of Wessex
 Æthelstan of Ramsbury, 10th-century bishop
 Æthelstan of Sussex, 8th-century South Saxon monarch
 Æthelstan Rota, 10th-century ealdorman under King Eadwig and King Edgar
 Guthrum the Old, 9th-century Danish King of East Anglia, who converted to Christianity and was baptised as Æthelstan after his peace with Alfred the Great

Given name 
 Athelstan Beckwith (1930–2010), Australian chemist
 Athelstan Jasper Blaxland (1880–1963), English consultant surgeon
 Athelstan Braxton Hicks (1854–1902), English coroner
 Athelstan Caroe (1903–1988), English merchant
 Athelstan Cornish-Bowden (1871–1942), South African surveyor
 Athelstan John Cornish-Bowden (b. 1943), British biochemist
 Athelstan Popkess (1895–1967), English police officer
 Athelstan Rendall (1871–1948), English politician
 Athelstan Rendall (pilot) (1914–2006), British pilot 
 Athelstan Riley (1858–1945), English composer
 Athelstan Saw (1868–1929), Australian university administrator
 Athelstan Spilhaus (1911–1998), South African  oceanographer

Fictional characters 
 Athelstane, in Ivanhoe by Sir Walter Scott
 Athelstan, in Vikings
 Athelstane King, in The Peshawar Lancers by S. M. Stirling

Places 
 Athelstane Range, an escarpment near Rockhampton, Queensland, Australia
 Athelstan, Quebec, a small town south of Huntingdon, Quebec, Canada
 Athelstan, Iowa, a community in the United States
 Athelstane Township, Clay County, Kansas, a township in the United States
 Athelstane, Wisconsin, a town in the United States
 Athelstane (community), Wisconsin, an unincorporated community in the United States

Other uses 
 SS Athelstane (1941), a tanker in service 1941–45

See also 
 SS Athelstane, a list of steamships
 Edelstein, the German and Yiddish cognate of Old English Æthelstan